Sandhuravirey 2 is a 2004 Maldivian horror film directed by Amjad Ibrahim and the sequel to his previous horror film Sandhuravirey (2002). Produced by Ahmed Sharan Hassan under Dash Studio, the film stars Yoosuf Shafeeu and Mariyam Nisha reprising their role as Dhiyash and Yaasha respectively. Shafeeu also played the role of their son, while Niuma Mohamed, Zeenath Abbas and Mohamed Shavin were added to the cast.

Premise
Dhiyash (Yoosuf Shafeeu) and Yaasha's second daughter, who possess features aligned more to her mother's origin, grows up to be another jinn (Sheereen Abdul Wahid) who schemed to avenge her mother and sister's death on Dhiyash's family. She first murdered Shafqa (Mariyam Nisha), a human lookalike of Yaasha, and kept continuously hassling Dhiyash and Shafqa's son, an established actor, Nail (Yoosuf Shafeeu). Disguised as other people, she complicates Nail's relationship with his girlfriend, Maya (Niuma Mohamed).

Cast 
 Yoosuf Shafeeu as Nail / Dhiyash
 Niuma Mohamed as Maya
 Mohamed Shavin as Ayaz
 Sheereen Abdul Wahid as jinn
 Zeenath Abbas as Dhiyana
 Mariyam Nisha as Shafqa / Yaasha
 Aminath Rasheedha as Dhiyana's mother
 Fauziyya Hassan as Maya's mother
 Neena Saleem as Jauza
 Ahmed Saeed as Matheenu
 Hamid Ali as Doctor (special appearances)

Soundtrack

References

2004 films
2004 horror films
Maldivian horror films
Films directed by Amjad Ibrahim